Klaten Station (KT) is a class I railway station located in Tonggalan, Central Klaten, Klaten Regency at an altitude of +151 meters, including in the Operation Area VI Yogyakarta. This station is close to the outer ring road of Klaten.

Most passenger trains passing the Solo–Yogyakarta route stop at this station.

To the east of this station, before the Ceper Station, there is a Ketandan Station which has been inactive since the Kutoarjo–Solo double tracks was operated.

Services
The following is a list of train services at the Klaten Station.

Passenger services
Executive class
Gajayana (facultative), to  via -- and to  via -
Mixed class
Singasari, to  via -- and to  via - (executive-economy plus)
Gaya Baru Malam Selatan, to  via -- and to  via -- (executive-economy plus)
Ranggajati, to  via - and to  continued to  via -- (executive-business)
Anjasmoro, to  via - and to  via  (executive-economy plus)
Senja Utama Solo, to  via -- (executive-premium economy)
Joglosemarkerto, Central Java and the Special Region of Yogyakarta executive-economy class plus trains with the following objectives:
 via - continued - via -
 continued 

Premium economy class
Jayakarta, to  via -- and to  via --
Plus economy class
Jaka Tingkir, to  via -- and to 
Economy class
Kahuripan, to  via - and to  via -
Pasundan, to  via - and to  via --
Bengawan, to  via -- and to 
Commuter Rail
Airport Rail Link
Adisumarmo Airport Rail Link, from and to -Adisoemarmo International Airport (airport executive)

References

External links
 

Klaten Regency
Railway stations in Central Java
Railway stations opened in 1871